Georgetown Ibayani is a Belizean football team which currently competes in the Belize Premier Football League (BPFL) of the Football Federation of Belize.

The team is based in the Cayo District.

Football clubs in Belize
2007 establishments in Belize
Association football clubs established in 2007